The 2021 Orlando Open II was a professional tennis tournament played on hard courts. It was the fourth edition of the tournament which was part of the 2021 ATP Challenger Tour. It took place in Orlando, Florida, United States between 7 and 13 June 2021.

Singles main-draw entrants

Seeds

 1 Rankings are as of 31 May 2021.

Other entrants
The following players received wildcards into the singles main draw:
  Oliver Crawford
  Sam Riffice
  Donald Young

The following players received entry from the qualifying draw:
  Dayne Kelly
  Stefan Kozlov
  Nicolás Mejía
  Thiago Agustín Tirante

Champions

Singles

  Christopher Eubanks def.  Nicolás Mejía 2–6, 7–6(7–3), 6–4.

Doubles

  Christian Harrison /  Peter Polansky def.  JC Aragone /  Nicolás Barrientos 6–2, 6–3.

References

2021 ATP Challenger Tour
2021 in American tennis
June 2021 sports events in the United States
2021 in sports in Florida